Charaxes baumanni, the little charaxes, is a butterfly in the family Nymphalidae. It is found in Sudan, Kenya, the Democratic Republic of the Congo, Uganda, Rwanda, Tanzania, Zambia, Malawi, Mozambique and Zimbabwe. The habitat consists of open forests and woodland.

Both sexes visit fermenting fruit and also animal scats. Adults are on wing year round.

The larvae feed on Acacia brevispica, Acacia seyal, Acacia brevispica, Pterolobium stellatum and Caesalpinia decapetala.

Description

Ch. baumanni Rghfr. male: hindwing above beyond the middle between veins 2 and 7 with a light blue transverse band, in the middle about 5 mm. in breadth, anteriorly narrowed, which is also continued on the forewing but is there much narrower and broken up into small spots; forewing otherwise unmarked, but the hindwing with white-centred submarginal spots and greenish (in cellules 4—6 orange-yellow) marginal streaks. The fine black median line of the under surface is also continuous on the forewing to the costal margin, straight and on both wings distally bordered with whitish. In the female the transverse band on the upper surface is pure white, somewhat further from the distal margin and continuous to vein 4 of the forewing, then divided into two rows of spots. Manicaland, Nyassaland and German East Africa. A full description is given by Walter Rothschild and Karl Jordan, 1900 Novitates Zoologicae Volume 7:287-524.  page 491-492 (for terms see Novitates Zoologicae Volume 5:545-601 )

Subspecies
C. b. baumanni (north-eastern Tanzania, south-eastern Kenya)
C. b. bamptoni van Someren, 1974 . (Kenya: north to Mount Kulal)
C. b. bwamba van Someren, 1971 (Uganda: Bwamba Valley, Democratic Republic of the Congo: Kivu)
C. b. didingensis van Someren, 1971 <ref>van Someren, V.G.L. 1971. Revisional notes on African Charaxes]] (Lepidoptera:
Nymphalidae). Part VII. Bulletin of the British Museum (Natural History) (Entomology) 26:181-226.</ref> (Sudan: south to the Didinga Mountains, northern Uganda, northern Kenya)C. b. granti Turlin, 1988, .  (eastern Tanzania)C. b. interposita van Someren, 1971 (western Kenya, eastern and central Uganda, north-western Tanzania)C. b. nyiro Collins & Larsen, 1991 (Kenya: north to Mount Nyiro)C. b. selousi Trimen, 1894  (southern and eastern Zimbabwe, central Zambia)C. b. tenuis van Someren, 1971 (northern Tanzania, Kenya: highlands east of the Rift Valley)C. b. whytei Butler, 1894  (Democratic Republic of the Congo, southern and western Tanzania, northern and eastern Zambia, Malawi, Mozambique)

TaxonomyCharaxes baumanni is a member of the large species group Charaxes etheocles

Realm
Afrotropical realm

References

Victor Gurney Logan Van Someren, 1971 Revisional notes on African Charaxes (Lepidoptera: Nymphalidae). Part VII. Bulletin of the British Museum (Natural History) (Entomology)181-226. 
Van Someren, 1974 Revisional notes on African Charaxes (Lepidoptera: Nymphalidae). Part IX. Bulletin of the British Museum of Natural History'' (Entomology) 29 (8):415-487.  Additional notes.

External links
Images of C. b. baumanni Royal Museum for Central Africa (Albertine Rift Project)
Images of C. b. bamptoni Royal Museum for Central Africa (Albertine Rift Project)
Images of C. b. bwamba Royal Museum for Central Africa (Albertine Rift Project)
Images of  C. b. interposita Royal Museum for Central Africa (Albertine Rift Project)
Images of C. b. tenuis Royal Museum for Central Africa (Albertine Rift Project)
Images of  C. b. whytei Royal Museum for Central Africa (Albertine Rift Project)
Charaxes baumanni images at Consortium for the Barcode of Life 
C. b. baumanni images at BOLD
C. b. interposita images at BOLD
African Butterfly Database Range map via search

Butterflies described in 1891
baumanni
Butterflies of Africa